Halsey House may refer to:

Egbert W. Halsey Cottage, Kirkwood, Missouri, National Register of Historic Places listing in St. Louis County, Missouri
Nicoll Halsey House and Halseyville Archeological Sites, Halseyville, New York, NRHP-listed
Halsey House (Southampton, New York)
Halsey Estate-Tallwood, West Hills, New York, NRHP-listed